Chaitanya Engineering College is a private engineering college in Bhimavaram, India.  It is affiliated with Jawaharlal Nehru Technological University, Kakinada.

References

External links

Engineering colleges in Andhra Pradesh
Universities and colleges in Visakhapatnam
Educational institutions in India with year of establishment missing